Lumbricus festivus also known as the Quebec worm, is a type of earthworm, a species of annelid.

References 

Lumbricidae
Animals described in 1826